Miguel Ángel Cancel Vázquez (born June 28, 1968) is an American singer, actor and retired police officer of Puerto Rican descent who began his career with the Puerto Rico-based boy band Menudo.

Career

Menudo
Born in Chicago, Illinois, Cancel joined Menudo as a singer in 1981, replacing Óscar Meléndez. He was the first bilingual element on the band, and he was part of the most iconic age of the band called "the golden age" next to Xavier Serbia, Rene Farrait, Ricky Meléndez, Johnny Lozada, Charlie Masso and Ray Reyes, collaborating in making Menudo an international sensation, with LP albums like Fuego, Quiero Ser, Por Amor and Una Aventura Llamada Menudo.

He acted in the 2 movies Menudo appeared at, Menudo: La Pelicula in 1981 and Una Aventura Llamada Menudo in 1982, and the two mini series Quiero Ser and Es Por Amor next to Xavier Serbia, Johnny Lozada, Charlie Masso, Ricky Meléndez and Rene Farrait, and he also appeared on the TV show, La Gente Joven de Menudo on Telemundo PR as a member of the group.

In 1983, Cancel quit drastically Menudo at the age of 15, a year before the mandatory retirement age of 16, due to his desire to live a "normal life", even as his voice was already recorded for Menudo's next album, "A Todo Rock". He was replaced by Roy Rosselló.

Cancel sang lead on various Menudo hits, including A Volar, Cuando Pasara, Por Amor, Xanadú, Quiero Rock, Me Voy A Enamoriscar etc.

Miguel entered at the end of  1980 and left at the end of 1983, an era that was part of what is the golden age of the band and the international "menuditis" era, the band becoming famous on countries like the U.S., Mexico, Peru and others

After Menudo

1980s
In 1984, Cancel released his first solo recording, the pop rock single entitled "Fun Fun Fun Fun" (English/Spanish). The single was produced and written by Doug Fieger, lead singer of The Knack, and issued on Cancel's newly formed independent label, Miguel Enterprises.

El Reencuentro
In 1998, Cancel was recruited by his ex bandmate Ray Reyes while he worked in the kitchen of a fast food restaurant in the suburbs of Los Angeles to join El Reencuentro, a group consisting of former Menudo members. The band recorded and issued an album of previously released Menudo songs and toured throughout the world in promotion of the album.

2000s-present
In 2003, Cancel became a police officer of the Coral Gables, Florida Police Department. In December 2004, he was ejected from the back seat of a Coral Gables police van resulting in the loss of two fingers from his left hand.

Cancel currently lives in Miami, Florida, with his family. He has 4 children Sasha Cancel, Izabella Cancel, Miguel Cancel, Jr. and Mariangelik Cancel. Miguel Cancel Jr. (Miguel Cancel Gulliver) is a swimmer who has won medals in competition at the Florida High School Athletic Association level.

In 2012, Cancel announced that he would again be returning to the music industry as a solo artist, his first solo effort having been in 1984.

In pop culture 

Miguel with Johnny, Ricky, Rene and Xavier, became part of the history of Latin music as the most important boy band of all times in Latin America, being icons of the decade with songs like "Claridad", "Fuego" and "Sùbete a mi moto" that are considered by many the most important and iconic songs in the history of Latin America

Cancel is played by Mauro Hernandez in the 2020 Amazon Prime Video series based on Menudo, Subete A Mi Moto.

Discography

With Menudo 
 Fuego (1981)
 Xanadu (1981)
 Quiero Ser (1981)
 Por Amor (1982)
 Una aventura llamada Menudo (1982)
 Feliz Navidad (1982)

See also

List of Puerto Ricans
List of Menudo members

References

External links
 Kiwanis award for Officer of the Month
 Racine Journal-Times article that mentions van crash
 

  

1968 births
Singers from Chicago
Living people
Puerto Rican law enforcement personnel
Los Angeles Police Department officers
Menudo (band) members
American male singers
American people of Puerto Rican descent
People from Coral Gables, Florida